An escapement is a mechanical linkage in mechanical watches and clocks that gives impulses to the timekeeping element and periodically releases the gear train to move forward, advancing the clock's hands. The impulse action transfers energy to the clock's timekeeping element (usually a pendulum or balance wheel) to replace the energy lost to friction during its cycle and keep the timekeeper oscillating. The escapement is driven by force from a coiled spring or a suspended weight, transmitted through the timepiece's gear train.  Each swing of the pendulum or balance wheel releases a tooth of the escapement's escape wheel, allowing the clock's gear train to advance or "escape" by a fixed amount. This regular periodic advancement moves the clock's hands forward at a steady rate.  At the same time, the tooth gives the timekeeping element a push, before another tooth catches on the escapement's pallet, returning the escapement to its "locked" state.  The sudden stopping of the escapement's tooth is what generates the characteristic "ticking" sound heard in operating mechanical clocks and watches.  

The first mechanical escapement, the verge escapement, was invented in medieval Europe during the 13th century, and was the crucial innovation which led to the development of the mechanical clock.   The design of the escapement has a large effect on a timepiece's accuracy, and improvements in escapement design drove improvements in time measurement during the era of mechanical timekeeping from the 13th through the 19th century.    

Escapements are also used in other mechanisms besides timepieces. Manual typewriters used escapements to step the carriage as each letter (or space) was typed. Historically, a liquid-driven escapement was used for a washstand design in ancient Greece and the Hellenistic world, particularly Ptolemaic Egypt, while liquid-driven escapements were applied to clockworks beginning  in Tang dynasty China and culminating during the Song dynasty.

History
The importance of the escapement in the history of technology is that it was the key invention that made the all-mechanical clock possible.  The invention of the first all-mechanical escapement, the verge escapement, in 13th-century Europe initiated a change in timekeeping methods from continuous processes, such as the flow of water in water clocks, to repetitive oscillatory processes, such as the swing of pendulums, which could yield more accuracy.  Oscillating timekeepers are used in every modern clock.

Liquid-driven escapements
The earliest liquid-driven escapement was described by the Greek engineer Philo of Byzantium (3rd century BC) in his technical treatise Pneumatics (chapter 31) as part of a washstand. A counterweighted spoon, supplied by a water tank, tips over in a basin when full, releasing a spherical piece of pumice in the process. Once the spoon has emptied, it is pulled up again by the counterweight, closing the door on the pumice by the tightening string. Remarkably, Philo's comment that "its construction is similar to that of clocks" indicates that such escapement mechanisms were already integrated in ancient water clocks.

In China, the Tang dynasty Buddhist monk Yi Xing along with government official Liang Lingzan made the escapement in 723 (or 725) to the workings of a water-powered armillary sphere and clock drive, which was the world's first clockwork escapement. Song dynasty (960–1279)  horologists Zhang Sixun (fl. late 10th century) and Su Song (1020–1101) duly applied escapement devices for their astronomical clock towers, before the technology stagnated and retrogressed. According to historian Derek J. de Solla Price, the Chinese escapement spread west and was the source for Western escapement technology. According to Ahmad Y. Hassan, a mercury escapement in a Spanish work for Alfonso X in 1277 can be traced back to earlier Arabic sources. Knowledge of these mercury escapements may have spread through Europe with translations of Arabic and Spanish texts.

However, none of these were true mechanical escapements, since they still depended on the flow of liquid through an orifice to measure time. For example, in Su Song's clock, water flowed into a container on a pivot. The escapement's role was to tip the container over each time it filled up, thus advancing the clock's wheels each time an equal quantity of water was measured out.  The time between releases depended on the rate of flow, as do all liquid clocks.  The rate of flow of a liquid through an orifice varies with temperature and viscosity changes, and decreases with pressure as the level of liquid in the source container drops.  The development of mechanical clocks depended on the invention of an escapement which would allow a clock's movement to be controlled by an oscillating weight.

Mechanical escapements
The first mechanical escapement, the verge escapement, was used in a bell ringing apparatus called an alarum for several centuries before it was adapted to clocks.  In 14th-century Europe it appeared as the timekeeper in the first mechanical clocks, which were large tower clocks (although some sources claim that French architect Villard de Honnecourt invented the first escapement around 1237 due to a drawing in his notebooks of a rope linkage to turn a statue of an angel to follow the sun, the consensus is that this was not an escapement.)  Its origin and first use is unknown because it is difficult to distinguish which of these early tower clocks were mechanical, and which were water clocks.  However, indirect evidence, such as a sudden increase in cost and construction of clocks, points to the late 13th century as the most likely date for the development of the modern clock escapement. Astronomer Robertus Anglicus wrote in 1271 that clockmakers were trying to invent an escapement, but hadn't been successful yet.  On the other hand, most sources agree that mechanical escapement clocks existed by 1300.

Actually, the earliest description of an escapement, in Richard of Wallingford's 1327 manuscript Tractatus Horologii Astronomici on the clock he built at the Abbey of St. Albans, was not a verge, but a variation called a strob escapement. It consisted of a pair of escape wheels on the same axle, with alternating radial teeth. The verge rod was suspended between them, with a short crosspiece that rotated first in one direction and then the other as the staggered teeth pushed past. Although no other example is known, it is possible that this was the first clock escapement design.

However, the verge was the standard escapement used in every other early clock and watch, and remained the only escapement for 400 years.  Its friction and recoil limited its performance,  but the accuracy of these verge and foliot clocks was more limited by their early foliot type balance wheels, which because they lacked a balance spring had no natural "beat", so there was not much incentive to improve the escapement.

The great leap in accuracy resulting from the invention of the pendulum and balance spring around 1657, which made the timekeeping elements in both watches and clocks harmonic oscillators, focused attention on the errors of the escapement, and more accurate escapements soon superseded the verge. The next two centuries, the "golden age" of mechanical horology, saw the invention of perhaps 300 escapement designs, although only about 10 stood the test of time and were widely used in clocks and watches.  These are described individually below.

The invention of the crystal oscillator and the quartz clock in the 1920s, which became the most accurate clock by the 1930s, shifted technological research in timekeeping to electronic methods, and escapement design ceased to play a role in advancing timekeeping precision.

Reliability
The reliability of an escapement depends on the quality of workmanship and the level of maintenance given. A poorly constructed or poorly maintained escapement will cause problems. The escapement must accurately convert the oscillations of the pendulum or balance wheel into rotation of the clock or watch gear train, and it must deliver enough energy to the pendulum or balance wheel to maintain its oscillation.

In many escapements, the unlocking of the escapement involves sliding motion; for example, in the animation shown above, the pallets of the anchor slide against the escapement wheel teeth as the pendulum swings.  The pallets are often made of very hard materials such as polished stone (for example, artificial ruby), but even so they normally require lubrication.  Since lubricating oil degrades over time due to evaporation, dust, oxidation, etc., periodic re-lubrication is needed.  If this is not done, the timepiece may work unreliably or stop altogether, and the escapement components may be subjected to rapid wear.  The increased reliability of modern watches is due primarily to the higher-quality oils used for lubrication. Lubricant lifetimes can be greater than five years in a high-quality watch.

Some escapements avoid sliding friction; examples include the grasshopper escapement of John Harrison in the 18th century, This may avoid the need for lubrication in the escapement (though it does not obviate the requirement for lubrication of other parts of the gear train).

Accuracy
The accuracy of a mechanical clock is dependent on the accuracy of the timing device. If this is a pendulum, then the period of swing of the pendulum determines the accuracy. If the pendulum rod is made of metal it will expand and contract with heat, lengthening or shortening the pendulum; this changes the time taken for a swing. Special alloys are used in expensive pendulum-based clocks to minimize this distortion. The degrees of arc which a pendulum may swing varies; highly accurate pendulum-based clocks have very small arcs in order to minimize the circular error.

Pendulum-based clocks can achieve outstanding accuracy. Even into the 20th century, pendulum-based clocks were reference time pieces in laboratories.

Escapements play a big part in accuracy as well. The precise point in the pendulum's travel at which impulse is supplied will affect how closely to time the pendulum will swing. Ideally, the impulse should be evenly distributed on either side of the lowest point of the pendulum's swing. This is called "being in beat." This is because pushing a pendulum when it's moving towards mid-swing makes it gain, whereas pushing it while it's moving away from mid-swing makes it lose. If the impulse is evenly distributed then it gives energy to the pendulum without changing the time of its swing.

The pendulum's period depends slightly on the size of the swing. If the amplitude changes from 4° to 3°, the period of the pendulum will decrease by about 0.013 percent, which translates into a gain of about 12 seconds per day. This is caused by the restoring force on the pendulum being circular not linear; thus, the period of the pendulum is only approximately linear in the regime of the small angle approximation. To be time independent, the path must be cycloidal. To minimize the effect with amplitude, pendulum swings are kept as small as possible.

It is important to note that as a rule, whatever the method of impulse the action of the escapement should have the smallest effect on the oscillator which can be achieved, whether a pendulum or the balance in a watch. This effect, which all escapements have to a larger or smaller degree is known as the escapement error.

Any escapement with sliding friction will need lubrication, but as this deteriorates the friction will increase, and, perhaps, insufficient power will be transferred to the timing device. If the timing device is a pendulum, the increased frictional forces will decrease the Q factor, increasing the resonance band, and decreasing its precision. For spring driven clocks, the impulse force applied by the spring changes as the spring is unwound, following Hooke's law. For gravity driven clocks, the impulse force also increases as the driving weight falls and more chain suspends the weight from the gear train; in practice, however, this effect is only seen in large public clocks, and it can be avoided by a closed-loop chain.

Watches and smaller clocks do not use pendulums as the timing device. Instead, they use a balance spring: a fine spring connected to a metal balance wheel that oscillates (rotates back and forth). Most modern mechanical watches have a working frequency of 3–4 Hz, or 6–8 beats per second (21,600–28,800 beats per hour; bph). Faster or slower speeds are used in some watches (33,600bph, or 19,800bph). The working frequency depends on the balance spring's stiffness (spring constant); to keep time, the stiffness should not vary with temperature. Consequently, balance springs use sophisticated alloys; in this area, watchmaking is still advancing. As with the pendulum, the escapement must provide a small kick each cycle to keep the balance wheel oscillating. Also, the same lubrication problem occurs over time; the watch will lose accuracy (typically it will speed up) when the escapement lubrication starts failing.

Pocket watches were the predecessor of modern wristwatches. Pocket watches, being in the pocket, were usually in a vertical orientation. Gravity causes some loss of accuracy as it magnifies over time any lack of symmetry in the weight of the balance. The tourbillon was invented to minimize this: the balance and spring is put in a cage which rotates (typically but not necessarily, once a minute), smoothing gravitational distortions. This very clever and sophisticated clock-work is a prized complication in wristwatches, even though the natural movement of the wearer tends to smooth gravitational influences anyway.

The most accurate commercially produced mechanical clock was the electromechanical Shortt-Synchronome free pendulum clock invented by W. H. Shortt in 1921, which had an uncertainty of about 1 second per year.  The most accurate mechanical clock to date is probably the electromechanical Littlemore Clock, built by noted archaeologist E. T. Hall in the 1990s.  In Hall's paper, he reports an uncertainty of 3 parts in 109 measured over 100 days (an uncertainty of about 0.02 seconds over that period).  Both of these clocks are electromechanical clocks: they use a pendulum as the timekeeping element, but electrical power rather than a mechanical gear train to supply energy to the pendulum.

Mechanical escapements

Since 1658 when the introduction of the pendulum and balance spring made accurate timepieces possible, it has been estimated that more than three hundred different mechanical escapements have been devised, but only about 10 have seen widespread use.  These are described below.  In the 20th century, electric timekeeping methods replaced mechanical clocks and watches, so escapement design became a little-known curiosity.

Verge escapement

The earliest mechanical escapement from about 1275) was the verge escapement, also known as the crown-wheel escapement. It was used in the first mechanical clocks and was originally controlled by a foliot, a horizontal bar with weights at either end.  The escapement consists of an escape wheel shaped somewhat like a crown, with pointed teeth sticking axially out of the side, oriented horizontally.  In front of the crown wheel is a vertical shaft, attached to the foliot at the top, and which carries two metal plates (pallets) sticking out like flags from a flag pole, oriented about ninety degrees apart, so only one engages the crown wheel teeth at a time.  As the wheel turns, one tooth pushes against the upper pallet, rotating the shaft and the attached foliot. As the tooth pushes past the upper pallet, the lower pallet swings into the path of the teeth on the other side of the wheel.  A tooth catches on the lower pallet, rotating the shaft back the other way, and the cycle repeats. A disadvantage of the escapement was that each time a tooth lands on a pallet, the momentum of the foliot pushes the crown wheel backwards a short distance before the force of the wheel reverses the motion.  This is called "recoil" and was a source of wear and inaccuracy.

The verge was the only escapement used in clocks and watches for 350 years.  In spring-driven clocks and watches, it required a fusee to even out the force of the mainspring.  It was used in the first pendulum clocks for about 50 years after the pendulum clock was invented in 1656. In a pendulum clock, the crown wheel and staff were oriented so they were horizontal, and the pendulum was hung from the staff.  However, the verge is the most inaccurate of the common escapements, and after the pendulum was introduced in the 1650s the verge began to be replaced by other escapements, being abandoned only by the late 1800s. By this time, the fashion for thin watches had required that the escape wheel be made very small, amplifying the effects of wear, and when a watch of this period is wound up today, it will often be found to run very fast, gaining many hours per day.

Cross-beat escapement
Jost Bürgi invented the cross-beat escapement in 1584, a variation of the verge escapement which had two foliots which rotated in opposite directions.  According to contemporary accounts, his clocks achieved remarkable accuracy of within a minute per day, two orders of magnitude better than other clocks of the time.  However, this improvement was probably not due to the escapement itself, but rather to better workmanship and his invention of the remontoire, a device which isolated the escapement from changes in drive force.    Without a balance spring, the crossbeat would have been no more isochronous than the verge.

Galileo's escapement 

Galileo's escapement is a design for a clock escapement, invented around 1637 by Italian scientist Galileo Galilei (1564 - 1642). It was the earliest design of a pendulum clock.  Since he was by then blind, Galileo described the device to his son, who drew a sketch of it. The son began construction of a prototype, but both he and Galileo died before it was completed.

Anchor escapement

Invented around 1657 by Robert Hooke, the anchor (see animation to the right) quickly superseded the verge to become the standard escapement used in pendulum clocks through the 19th century. Its advantage was that it reduced the wide pendulum swing angles of the verge to 3–6°, making the pendulum nearly isochronous, and allowing the use of longer, slower-moving pendulums, which used less energy.    The anchor is responsible for the long narrow shape of most pendulum clocks, and for the development of the grandfather clock, the first anchor clock to be sold commercially, which was invented around 1680 by William Clement, who disputed credit for the escapement with Hooke. The escapement increased the accuracy of pendulum clocks to such a degree that the minute hand was added to the clock face in the late 1600s (before this, clocks had only an hour hand).

The anchor consists of an escape wheel with pointed, backward slanted teeth, and an "anchor"-shaped piece pivoted above it which rocks from side to side, linked to the pendulum. The anchor has slanted pallets on the arms which alternately catch on the teeth of the escape wheel, receiving impulses. Mechanically its operation has similarities to the verge escapement, and it has two of the verge's disadvantages: (1) The pendulum is constantly being pushed by an escape wheel tooth throughout its cycle, and is never allowed to swing freely, which disturbs its isochronism, and (2) it is a recoil escapement; the anchor pushes the escape wheel backward during part of its cycle. This causes backlash, increased wear in the clock's gears, and inaccuracy. These problems were eliminated in the deadbeat escapement, which slowly replaced the anchor in precision clocks.

Deadbeat escapement

The Graham or deadbeat escapement was an improvement of the anchor escapement first made by Thomas Tompion to a design by Richard Towneley in 1675 although it is often credited to Tompion's successor George Graham who popularized it in 1715. In the anchor escapement the swing of the pendulum pushes the escape wheel backward during part of its cycle.  This 'recoil' disturbs the motion of the pendulum, causing inaccuracy, and reverses the direction of the gear train, causing backlash and introducing high loads into the system, leading to friction and wear.  The main advantage of the deadbeat is that it eliminated recoil.

In the deadbeat, the pallets have a second curved "locking" face on them, concentric about the pivot on which the anchor turns.  During the extremities of the pendulum's swing, the escape wheel tooth rests against this locking face, providing no impulse to the pendulum, which prevents recoil.  Near the bottom of the pendulum's swing the tooth slides off the locking face onto the angled "impulse" face, giving the pendulum a push, before the pallet releases the tooth.  The deadbeat was first used in precision regulator clocks, but due to greater accuracy superseded the anchor in the 19th century.  It is used in almost all modern pendulum clocks except for tower clocks which often use gravity escapements.

Pin wheel escapement

Invented around 1741 by Louis Amant, this version of a deadbeat escapement can be made quite rugged. Instead of using teeth, the escape wheel has round pins that are stopped and released by a scissors-like anchor. This escapement, which is also called Amant escapement or (in Germany) Mannhardt escapement, is used quite often in tower clocks.

Detent escapement

The detent or chronometer escapement is considered the most accurate of the balance wheel escapements, and was used in marine chronometers, although some precision watches during the 18th and 19th century also used it. The early form was invented by Pierre Le Roy in 1748, who created a pivoted detent type of escapement, though this was theoretically deficient. The first effective design of detent escapement was invented by John Arnold around 1775, but with the detent pivoted. This escapement was modified by Thomas Earnshaw in 1780 and patented by Wright (for whom he worked) in 1783; however, as depicted in the patent it was unworkable. Arnold also designed a spring detent escapement but, with improved design, Earnshaw's version eventually prevailed as the basic idea underwent several minor modifications during the last decade of the 18th century. The final form appeared around 1800, and this design was used until mechanical chronometers became obsolete in the 1970s.

The detent is a detached escapement; it allows the balance wheel to swing undisturbed during most of its cycle, except the brief impulse period, which is only given once per cycle (every other swing).  Because the driving escape wheel tooth moves almost parallel to the pallet, the escapement has little friction and does not need oiling.  For these reasons among others, the detent was considered the most accurate escapement for balance wheel timepieces.  John Arnold was the first to use the detent escapement with an overcoil balance spring (patented 1782), and with this improvement his watches were the first really accurate pocket timekeepers, keeping time to within 1 or 2 seconds per day. These were produced from 1783 onwards.

However, the escapement had disadvantages which limited its use in watches: it was fragile and required skilled maintenance; it was not self-starting, so if the watch was jarred in use so the balance wheel stopped, it would not start up again; and it was harder to manufacture in volume.  Therefore, the self-starting lever escapement became dominant in watches.

Cylinder escapement

The horizontal or cylinder escapement, invented by Thomas Tompion in 1695 and perfected by George Graham in 1726, was one of the escapements which replaced the verge escapement in pocketwatches after 1700.  A major attraction was that it was much thinner than the verge, allowing watches to be made fashionably slim.  Clockmakers found it suffered from excessive wear, so it was not much used during the 18th century, except in a few high-end watches with the cylinders made from ruby.   The French solved this problem by making the cylinder and escape wheel of hardened steel, and the escapement was used in large numbers in inexpensive French and Swiss pocketwatches and small clocks from the mid-19th to the 20th century. 

Rather than pallets, the escapement uses a cutaway cylinder on the balance wheel shaft, which the escape teeth enter one by one.  Each wedge-shaped tooth impulses the balance wheel by pressure on the cylinder edge as it enters,  is held inside the cylinder as it turns, and impulses the wheel again as it leaves out the other side.  The wheel usually had 15 teeth, and impulsed the balance over an angle of  20° to 40° in each direction.  It is a frictional rest escapement, with the teeth in contact with the cylinder over the whole balance wheel cycle, and so was not as accurate as "detached" escapements like the lever, and the high friction forces caused excessive wear and necessitated more frequent cleaning.

Duplex escapement

The duplex watch escapement was invented by Robert Hooke around 1700, improved by Jean Baptiste Dutertre and Pierre Le Roy, and put in final form by Thomas Tyrer, who patented it in 1782.
The early forms had two escape wheels.   The duplex escapement was difficult to make but achieved much higher accuracy than the cylinder escapement, and could equal that of the (early) lever escapement and when carefully made was almost as good as a detent escapement.

It was used in quality English pocketwatches from about 1790 to 1860,

 and in the Waterbury, a cheap American 'everyman's' watch, during 1880–1898.

In the duplex, as in the chronometer escapement to which it has similarities, the balance wheel only receives an impulse during one of the two swings in its cycle.

The escape wheel has two sets of teeth (hence the name 'duplex'); long locking teeth project from the side of the wheel, and short impulse teeth stick up axially from the top.  The cycle starts with a locking tooth resting against the ruby disk.  As the balance wheel swings counterclockwise through its center position, the notch in the ruby disk releases the tooth.  As the escape wheel turns, the pallet is in just the right position to receive a push from an impulse tooth.  Then the next locking tooth drops onto the ruby roller and stays there while the balance wheel completes its cycle and swings back clockwise (CW), and the process repeats.  During the CW swing, the impulse tooth falls momentarily into the ruby roller notch again, but isn't released.

The duplex is technically a frictional rest escapement; the tooth resting against the roller adds some friction to the balance wheel during its swing but this is very minimal.  As in the chronometer, there is little sliding friction during impulse since pallet and impulse tooth are moving almost parallel, so little lubrication is needed.

However, it lost favor to the lever; its tight tolerances and sensitivity to shock made duplex watches unsuitable for active people.  Like the chronometer, it is not self-starting and is vulnerable to "setting;" if a sudden jar stops the balance during its CW swing, it can't get started again.

Lever escapement

The lever escapement, invented by Thomas Mudge in 1750, has been used in the vast majority of watches since the 19th century.  Its advantages are (1) it is a "detached" escapement; unlike the cylinder or duplex escapements the balance wheel is only in contact with the lever during the short impulse period when it swings through its centre position and swings freely the rest of its cycle, increasing accuracy, and (2) it is a self-starting escapement, so if the watch is shaken so that the balance wheel stops, it will automatically start again.  The original form was the rack lever escapement, in which the lever and the balance wheel were always in contact via a gear rack on the lever. Later, it was realized that all the teeth from the gears could be removed except one, and this created the detached lever escapement.  British watchmakers used the English detached lever, in which the lever was at right angles to the balance wheel.  Later Swiss and American manufacturers used the inline lever, in which the lever is inline between the balance wheel and the escape wheel; this is the form used in modern watches.  In 1867, Georges Frederic Roskopf invented an inexpensive, less accurate form called the Roskopf or pin-pallet escapement, which was used in cheap "dollar watches" in the early 20th century and is still used in cheap alarm clocks and kitchen timers.

Grasshopper escapement

A rare but interesting mechanical escapement is John Harrison's grasshopper escapement invented in 1722. In this escapement, the pendulum is driven by two hinged arms (pallets). As the pendulum swings, the end of one arm catches on the escape wheel and drives it slightly backwards; this releases the other arm which moves out of the way to allow the escape wheel to pass. When the pendulum swings back again, the other arm catches the wheel, pushes it back and releases the first arm and so on. The grasshopper escapement has been used in very few clocks since Harrison's time.  Grasshopper escapements made by Harrison in the 18th century are still operating. Most escapements wear far more quickly, and waste far more energy.  However, like other early escapements the grasshopper impulses the pendulum throughout its cycle; it is never allowed to swing freely, causing error due to variations in drive force, and 19th-century clockmakers found it uncompetitive with more detached escapements like the deadbeat.  Nevertheless, with enough care in construction it is capable of accuracy.  A modern experimental grasshopper clock, the Burgess Clock B, had a measured error of only  of a second during 100 running days.  After two years of operation, it had an error of only ±0.5 sec, after barometric correction.

Gravity escapement
A gravity escapement uses a small weight or a weak spring to give an impulse directly to the pendulum. The earliest form consisted of two arms which were pivoted very close to the suspension spring of the pendulum with one arm on each side of the pendulum. Each arm carried a small dead beat pallet with an angled plane leading to it. When the pendulum lifted one arm far enough its pallet would release the escape wheel. Almost immediately another tooth on the escape wheel would start to slide up the angle face on the other arm thereby lifting the arm. It would reach the pallet and stop. The other arm meanwhile was still in contact with pendulum and coming down again to a point lower than it had started from. This lowering of the arm provides the impulse to the pendulum. The design was developed steadily from the middle of the 18th century to the middle of the 19th century. It eventually became the escapement of choice for turret clocks, because their wheel trains are subjected to large variations in drive force caused by the large exterior hands, with their varying wind, snow, and ice loads. Since in a gravity escapement the drive force from the wheel train does not itself impel the pendulum but merely resets the weights that provide the impulse, the escapement is not affected by variations in drive force.

The 'Double Three-legged Gravity Escapement' shown here is a form of escapement first devised by a barrister named Bloxam and later improved by Lord Grimthorpe. It is the standard for all accurate 'Tower' clocks. 
 
In the animation shown here the two "gravity arms" are coloured blue and red. The two three-legged escape wheels are also coloured blue and red. They work in two parallel planes so that the blue wheel only impacts the locking block on the blue arm and the red wheel only impacts the red arm. In a real escapement these impacts give rise to loud audible "ticks" and these are indicated by the appearance of a * beside the locking blocks. The three black lifting pins are key to the operation of the escapement. They cause the weighted gravity arms to be raised by an amount indicated by the pair of parallel lines on each side of the escapement. This gain in potential energy is the energy given to the pendulum on each cycle. For the Trinity College Cambridge Clock a mass of around 50 grams is lifted through 3 mm each 1.5 seconds - which works out to 1 mW of power. The driving power from the falling weight is about 12 mW, so there is a substantial excess of power used to drive the escapement. Much of this energy is dissipated in the acceleration and deceleration of the frictional "fly" attached to the escape wheels.

The great clock at Westminster that rings London's Big Ben uses a double three-legged gravity escapement.

Coaxial escapement

Invented around 1974 and patented 1980 by British watchmaker George Daniels, the coaxial escapement is one of the few new watch escapements adopted commercially in modern times.

It could be regarded as having its distant origins in the escapement invented by Robert Robin, C.1792, which gives a single impulse in one direction; with the locking achieved by passive lever pallets, the design of the coaxial escapement is more akin to that of another Robin variant, the Fasoldt escapement, which was invented and patented by the American Charles Fasoldt in 1859.
Both Robin and Fasoldt escapements give impulse in one direction only.
The latter escapement has a lever with unequal drops; this engages with two escape wheels of differing diameters. The smaller impulse wheel acts on the single pallet at the end of the lever, whilst the pointed lever pallets lock on the larger wheel.
The balance engages with and is impelled by the lever through a roller pin and lever fork. The lever 'anchor' pallet locks the larger wheel and, on this being unlocked, a pallet on the end of the lever is given an impulse by the smaller wheel through the lever fork. The return stroke is 'dead', with the 'anchor' pallets serving only to lock and unlock, impulse being given in one direction through the single lever pallet.
As with the duplex, the locking wheel is larger in order to reduce pressure and thus friction.

The Daniels escapement, however, achieves a double impulse with passive lever pallets serving only to lock and unlock the larger wheel. On one side, impulse is given by means of the smaller wheel acting on the lever pallet through the roller and impulse pin. On the return, the lever again unlocks the larger wheel, which gives an impulse directly onto an impulse roller on the balance staff.

The main advantage is that this enables both impulses to occur on or around the centre line, with disengaging friction in both directions.
This mode of impulse is in theory superior to the lever escapement, which has engaging friction on the entry pallet. For long this was recognized as a disturbing influence on the isochronism of the balance.

Purchasers no longer buy mechanical watches primarily for their accuracy, so manufacturers had little interest in investing in the tooling required, although finally Omega adopted it in 1990.

Other modern watch escapements

Since accuracy far greater than any mechanical watch is achievable with low cost quartz watches, improved escapement designs are no longer motivated by practical timekeeping needs but as novelties in the high-end watch market. In an effort to attract publicity, in recent decades some high-end mechanical watch makers have introduced new escapements.  None of these have been adopted by any watchmakers beyond their original creator.

Based on patents initially submitted by Rolex on behalf of inventor Nicolas Déhon, the constant escapement was developed by Girard-Perregaux as working prototypes in 2008 (Nicolas Déhon was then head of Girard-Perregaux R&D department) and in watches by 2013.

The key component of this escapement is a silicon buckled-blade which stores elastic energy. This blade is flexed to a point close to its unstable state, and is released with a snap each swing of the balance wheel to give the wheel an impulse, after which it is cocked again by the wheeltrain.  The advantage claimed is that since the blade imparts the same amount of energy to the wheel each release, the balance wheel is isolated from variations in impulse force due to the wheeltrain and mainspring which cause inaccuracies in conventional escapements.   

Parmigiani Fleurier with its Genequand escapement and Ulysse Nardin with its Ulysse Anchor escapement have taken advantage of the properties of silicon flat springs. The independent watchmaker, De Bethune, has developed a concept where a magnet makes a resonator vibrate at high frequency, replacing the traditional balance spring.

Electromechanical escapements
In the late 19th century, electromechanical escapements were developed for pendulum clocks. In these, a switch or phototube energised an electromagnet for a brief section of the pendulum's swing. On some clocks the pulse of electricity that drove the pendulum also drove a plunger to move the gear train.

Hipp clock
In 1843, Matthäus Hipp first mentioned a purely mechanical clock being driven by a switch called "echappement à palette". A varied version of that escapement has been used from the 1860s inside electrically driven pendulum clocks, the so-called "hipp-toggle". Since the 1870s, in an improved version the pendulum drove a ratchet wheel via a pawl on the pendulum rod, and the ratchet wheel drove the rest of the clock train to indicate the time. The pendulum was not impelled on every swing or even at a set interval of time. It was only impelled when its arc of swing had decayed below a certain level. As well as the counting pawl, the pendulum carried a small vane, known as a Hipp's toggle, pivoted at the top, which was completely free to swing. It was placed so that it dragged across a triangular polished block with a vee-groove in the top of it. When the arc of swing of the pendulum was large enough, the vane crossed the groove and swung free on the other side. If the arc was too small the vane never left the far side of the groove, and when the pendulum swung back it pushed the block strongly downwards. The block carried a contact which completed the circuit to the electromagnet which impelled the pendulum. The pendulum was only impelled as required.

This type of clock was widely used as a master clock in large buildings to control numerous slave clocks. Most telephone exchanges used such a clock to control timed events such as were needed to control the setup and charging of telephone calls by issuing pulses of varying durations such as every second, six seconds and so on.

Synchronome switch 
Designed in 1895 by Frank Hope-Jones, the Synchronome switch and gravity escapement were the basis for the majority of their clocks in the 20th century. And also the basis of the slave pendulum in the Short-Synchronome free pendulum clock. A gathering arm attached to the pendulum moves a 15-tooth count wheel in one position, with a pawl preventing movement in the reverse direction. The wheel has a vane attached which, once per 30-second turn, releases the gravity arm. When the gravity arm falls it pushes against a pallet attached directly to the pendulum, giving it a push. Once the arm has fallen, it makes an electrical contact that energises an electromagnet to reset the gravity arm and acts as the half-minute impulse for the slave clocks.

Free pendulum clock

In the 20th century the English horologist William Hamilton Shortt invented a free pendulum clock, patented in September 1921 and manufactured by the Synchronome Company, with an accuracy of one hundredth of a second a day. In this system the timekeeping "master" pendulum, whose rod is made from a special steel alloy with 36% nickel called Invar whose length changes very little with temperature, swings as free of external influence as possible sealed in a vacuum chamber and does no work. It is in mechanical contact with its escapement for only a fraction of a second every 30 seconds. A secondary "slave" pendulum turns a ratchet, which triggers an electromagnet slightly less than every thirty seconds. This electromagnet releases a gravity lever onto the escapement above the master pendulum. A fraction of a second later (but exactly every 30 seconds), the motion of the master pendulum releases the gravity lever to fall farther. In the process, the gravity lever gives a tiny impulse to the master pendulum, which keeps that pendulum swinging. The gravity lever falls onto a pair of contacts, completing a circuit that does several things:

 energizes a second electromagnet to raise the gravity lever above the master pendulum to its top position,
 sends a pulse to activate one or more clock dials, and
 sends a pulse to a synchronizing mechanism that keeps the slave pendulum in step with the master pendulum.

Since it is the slave pendulum that releases the gravity lever, this synchronization is vital to the functioning of the clock. The synchronizing mechanism used a small spring attached to the shaft of the slave pendulum and an electromagnetic armature that would catch the spring if the slave pendulum was running slightly late, thus shortening the period of the slave pendulum for one swing.  The slave pendulum was adjusted to run slightly slow, such that on approximately every other synchronization pulse the spring would be caught by the armature.

This form of clock became a standard for use in observatories (roughly 100 such clocks were manufactured), and was the first clock capable of detecting small variations in the speed of Earth's rotation.

See also

 Escapement (radio control)

References

 , p. 56-58

Notes

Further reading

External links

 Mark Headrick's horology page, with animated pictures of many escapements
 Performance Of The Daniels Coaxial Escapement, Horological Journal, August 2004
 Watch and Clock Escapements, The Keystone (magazine), 1904, via Project Gutenberg: "A Complete Study in Theory and Practice of the Lever, Cylinder and Chronometer Escapements, Together with a Brief Account of the Origin and Evolution of the Escapement in Horology."
 US Patent number 5140565, issued 23 March 1992, for a cycloidal pendulum similar to that of Huygens
 findarticles.com: Obituary of Professor Edward Hall, The Independent (London), 16 August 2001
 American Watchmakers-Clockmakers Institute, non-profit trade association
 Federation of the Swiss Watch Industry FH, watch industry trade association
 Method for transmitting bursts of mechanical energy from a power source to an oscillating
 Alternative Escapements, Europa Star, September 2014
 Evolution of the escapement, Monochrome-watches, Xavier Markl, February 2016

 
Ancient Greek technology
Ancient inventions
Chinese inventions
English inventions
Greek inventions
Hellenistic engineering
Mechanical power control
Timekeeping components